This is a list of singles that have peaked in the top 10 of the Billboard Hot 100 during 1962.

Elvis Presley, Chubby Checker, Ray Charles, Dion, and Connie Francis each had four top-ten hits in 1962, tying them for the most top-ten hits during the year.

Top-ten singles

1961 peaks

1963 peaks

See also
 1962 in music
 List of Hot 100 number-one singles of 1962 (U.S.)
 Billboard Year-End Hot 100 singles of 1962

References

General sources

Joel Whitburn Presents the Billboard Hot 100 Charts: The Sixties
Additional information obtained can be verified within Billboard's online archive services and print editions of the magazine.

1962
United States Hot 100 Top 10